Henry Wells (1805–1878) was an American businessman and co-founder of American Express and Wells Fargo.

Henry Wells may also refer to:
Henry Wells (professor) (c. 17th century), English theologian and 10th Gresham Professor of Divinity
Henry H. Wells (1823–1900), Governor of Virginia
Henry Gordon Wells (1879–1954), American lawyer and Massachusetts and New Hampshire politician
Henry Wells (rowing) (1891–1967), English judge and rowing coxswain
Henry Wells (general) (1898–1973), Chief of the Australian General Staff
Henry Wells (author) (1914–2007), American author, professor, and expert on Latin America politics
Henry Jackson Wells (1823–1912), American politician in Massachusetts
Henry Tanworth Wells (1828–1903), English miniature and portrait painter
Henry Wells (musician) (1906–?), American jazz musician
Henry Wells (Master of Trinity Hall, Cambridge) (died 1429), English academic

See also
Harry Wells (disambiguation)
Henry Welles (disambiguation)
Henry Wells Tracy (1807–1886), Member of the U.S. House of Representatives
Clark Henry Wells (1822–1888), U.S. Navy Rear Admiral